Hollywood's Bleeding is the third studio album by American rapper and singer Post Malone. It was released on September 6, 2019, by Republic Records. The album features guest appearances from DaBaby, Future, Halsey, Meek Mill, Lil Baby, Ozzy Osbourne, Travis Scott, SZA, Swae Lee, and Young Thug. The production was handled mainly by Louis Bell, with contributions by Andrew Watt, BloodPop, Brian Lee, Carter Lang, DJ Dahi, Emile Haynie, Frank Dukes, and Malone himself, among others.

Hollywood's Bleeding received generally positive reviews and debuted at number one on the US Billboard 200. It is Malone's second US number-one album, and it was supported by six singles: "Wow", "Goodbyes", "Circles", "Enemies", "Allergic", and "Take What You Want". The first three singles peaked at number two, three, and one on the US Billboard Hot 100, respectively. The album also includes the Billboard Hot 100 number-one single, "Sunflower", a collaboration with American rapper Swae Lee, from the Spider-Man: Into the Spider-Verse soundtrack. It was nominated for Album of the Year at the 2021 Grammy Awards.

Background
On June 5, 2018, six weeks after the release of his second studio album Beerbongs & Bentleys, it was reported that Post Malone was working on his third studio album. That November, Malone stated that he was "trying to put out a new body of work" before the end of the year, but only released the single "Wow" in that time. On July 28, 2019, Malone shared that he had finished recording his upcoming third studio album, describing it as "pretty goddamn out of sight".

Promotion

Singles
The album's lead single, "Wow", was released on December 24, 2018, one day before Christmas. The song was produced by Louis Bell and Frank Dukes. It peaked at number two on the US Billboard Hot 100.

The album's second single, "Goodbyes"  featuring Young Thug, was released on July 5, 2019, one day after Malone's birthday. The song was produced by Brian Lee and Louis Bell. It peaked at number three on the Billboard Hot 100.

The album's third single, "Circles", was released for digital download on August 30, 2019. It was later sent to contemporary hit radio on September 3, 2019. The song was produced by Malone himself, Louis Bell, and Frank Dukes. It peaked at number one on the Billboard Hot 100.

"Enemies" featuring DaBaby, was sent to rhythmic contemporary radio on September 17, 2019, as the album's fourth single. It peaked at number 16 on the Billboard Hot 100.

"Allergic" was sent to alternative radio on September 24, 2019, as the album's fifth single. It peaked at number 37 on the Billboard Hot 100.

"Take What You Want" featuring Ozzy Osbourne and Travis Scott, was sent to contemporary hit radio on October 15, 2019, as the album's sixth single. It peaked at number eight on the Billboard Hot 100.

Other songs
A music video for the track "Saint-Tropez" was released on September 11, 2019. The song peaked at number 18 on the Billboard Hot 100.

Tour
To further promote the album, Post announced the Runaway Tour with Swae Lee and Tyla Yaweh joining as the opening acts. The tour had two North American legs, and began September 14, 2019, in Tacoma, Washington and concluded March 12, 2020, in Denver.

Critical reception

Hollywood's Bleeding was met with generally positive reviews. At Metacritic, which assigns a normalized rating out of 100 to reviews from professional publications, the album received an average score of 79, based on 10 reviews. Aggregator AnyDecentMusic? gave it 6.9 out of 10, based on their assessment of the critical consensus.

Danny Wright of NME gave the album a positive review, saying "he's able to skillfully cherry pick from different genres[, ...] But Post Malone is the post everything star the kids have called for, a musician made for the internet-age; a goofball chameleon instinctively skilled at understanding the ways genres can merge together. These are albums made as playlists that skip seamlessly between styles". Reviewing the album for Variety, A. D. Amorosi said the album was a blend of "country, rock, hip-hop and modern soft soul" and that Malone gives the album a "refined trap-pop vibe". Neil Z. Yeung of AllMusic saying "More well-executed than his previous releases and undeniably catchy, Hollywood's Bleeding is a huge step forward for the guarded superstar, one that doesn't sacrifice the essential elements that made him such a surprise hitmaker, and pushes him even further into the pop-savvy landscape where he belongs". Writing for Los Angeles Times, Mikael Wood stated, "Unlike Stoney and Beerbongs & Bentleys, this album feels composed of discrete stylistic exercises; no longer is he boiling down rap and rock and a little bit of country into a kind of smearable paste". Rolling Stones critic Nick Catucci said, "Post Malone curates as much as he creates, and there's not a misplaced feature among the 10 spread across seven of these tracks".

Dan Weiss of Consequence wrote, "Hollywood's Bleeding is immediately Post Malone's most listenable work and may well be the catchiest album you hear in 2019, and that includes Taylor Swift". Daniel Spielberger of HipHopDX said, "Besides a few questionable features, there's nothing offensive or particularly bad about Hollywood's Bleeding. It's just Malone playing it safe and betting on the likelihood that the streaming algorithms will reward him once again". Jason Greene from Pitchfork stated, "When he's not wasting time trying to glower, he proves himself surprisingly versatile. ... There are a lot of guests on Hollywood's Bleeding, and all of them sound engaged".

Year-end lists

Industry awards

Commercial performance
Hollywood's Bleeding debuted at number one on the US Billboard 200 with 489,000 album-equivalent units, of which 200,000 were pure album sales, giving Post Malone his second US number-one album. It also marks the second-biggest week of 2019 for an album only behind Taylor Swift's Lover, and biggest in terms of streams. By the end of 2019 the album had sold 357,000 pure copies out of a sales total of 3.001 million combined units. Hollywood's Bleeding was the sixth best selling album of 2020 with 1.895 million album-equivalent units in the United States.

Track listing

Notes
 "Wow" is stylized as "Wow."

Personnel
Musicians
 Kaan Güneşberk – programming, all instruments (tracks 5, 6)
 Anthoine Walters – background vocals (track 13)
 BloodPop – background vocals (track 17)

Technical
 Louis Bell – recording (all tracks), vocal production (all tracks)
 Simon Todkill – recording (track 4)
 Paul LaMalfa – recording (tracks 7, 9)
 Anthony Cruz – recording (tracks 8, 10)
 A. Bainz – recording (track 14)
 Shaan Singh – recording (track 14)
 Dave Rowland – recording (track 15)
 Manny Marroquin – mixing (all tracks)
 Chris Galland – mixing assistance (all tracks)
 Robin Florent – mixing assistance (all tracks)
 Scott Desmarais – mixing assistance (all tracks)
 Jeremie Inhaber – mixing assistance (all tracks)
 Mike Bozzi – mastering (all tracks)

Charts

Weekly charts

Year-end charts

Certifications

References

2019 albums
Albums produced by Andrew Watt (record producer)
Albums produced by DJ Dahi
Albums produced by Emile Haynie
Albums produced by Frank Dukes
Albums produced by Happy Perez
Albums produced by Louis Bell
Post Malone albums
Albums produced by Post Malone
Albums produced by BloodPop
Albums produced by Nick Mira
Republic Records albums